Alakija is a surname of Yoruba origin. Notable people with the surname include:

Adeyemo Alakija (1884–1952), Nigerian lawyer, politician and businessman
Aduke Alakija (1921–2016), Nigerian lawyer and diplomat 
Tejumade Alakija (1925–2013), Nigeria  civil servant and educator
Danielle Alakija (born 1996), Fijian athlete
Folorunsho Alakija (born 1951), Nigerian businesswoman
Rotimi Alakija, British DJ

Yoruba-language surnames